Albert Jansz. Klomp or Albert  Klomp (Amsterdam, Baptized March 11, 1625 - earliest December 20, 1688) was a Dutch Golden Age painter, who specialized in painting rural landscapes with animals.

Klomp's typical pastoral landscape paintings can be seen in museums such as the Rijksmuseum, the Fitzwilliam Museum, and The Metropolitan Museum of Art. 
Klomp's work is reminiscent of that of Paulus Potter. Although it is not certain that they worked together, the two artists share similar subjects and style, and Klomp's work has been wrongly attributed to Potter in the past.

Gallery

References 

1625 births
1688 deaths
Landscape artists
Dutch Golden Age painters
Painters from Amsterdam